Ulam's conjecture may refer to:

 The Collatz conjecture
 The reconstruction conjecture
 Ulam's packing conjecture